Oceansat is a series of earth observation satellites built, launched, and operated by Indian Space Research Organisation, and dedicated to oceanography and atmospheric studies.  Oceansat satellites facilitate a range of applications including documenting chlorophyll concentration, phytoplankton blooms, atmospheric aerosols and particulate matter as well as marine weather forecast to predict cyclones.

Satellites

Oceansat-1 

OceanSat-1 was the first Indian satellite built specifically for oceanographic applications. The satellite carried an Ocean Colour Monitor (OCM) and a multi-frequency scanning microwave radiometer. Oceansat-1 was launched on board a PSLV rocket on 26 May 1999.

It was capable of detecting eight spectrums ranging from 400 nm to 885 nm, all in the visible or near infrared spectrums. The second, the Multi-frequency Scanning Microwave Radiometer, collects data by measuring microwave radiation passing through the atmosphere over the ocean. This offers information including sea surface temperature, wind speed, cloud water content, and water vapour content.

Although initially launched with a lifespan of 5 years, Oceansat-1 completed its mission on August 8, 2010, after serving for 11 years and 2 months.

Oceansat-2 

Oceansat-2 is designed to provide service continuity for operational users of the Ocean Colour Monitor (OCM) instrument on Oceansat-1 and enhance the potential of applications in other areas.

A swath width of 1420 km is provided. An along-track instrument tilt capability of ±20º is provided to avoid sun glint.

Satellite was launched aboard a PSLV-CA on 23 September 2009.

SCATSAT-1 

SCATSAT-1 was launched in 2016 after SCAT (Scanning scatterometer) on Oceansat-2 became dysfunctional after its life span of four-and-a-half years. SCATSAT carries a Ku-band scatterometer similar to the one on Oceansat-2.

Oceansat-3 
Oceansat-3 was launched on 26 November 2022, Oceansat-3 will provide continuity to operators of OCM and enhanced ability in other applications by way of simultaneous Sea Surface Temperature (SST) measurements. As of March 2021, ISRO and CNES completed interface control document to accommodate Argos in Oceansat-3.

Launch schedule

See also 
 Indian Remote Sensing Programme
 Cartosat
 RISAT
 Indian Space Research Organisation

References 

Space programme of India
Earth observation satellites of India
Oceanographic satellites
Satellite series